Deivapiravi is a 1985 Indian Tamil-language romantic drama film directed by R. Krishnamoorthy and starring Mohan, Raadhika, and Urvashi. The film was a remake of the Telugu film Devatha (1982). It was released on 14 April 1985 and ran for one-hundred days in theatres.

Plot

Cast 
Mohan as Mohan
Raadhika as  Janaki
Urvashi as Lalitha
Radha Ravi as Minor
Oppanai Gajapathi
V. K. Ramasamy
Thengai Srinivasan
Idichapuli Selvaraj
Master Suresh
Manorama
Pushpalatha
C.I.D. Sakunthala Ayya
S. N. Lakshmi

Production 
The film is directed by R. Krishnamoorthy, who was known for directing Billa (1980), and  produced by D. Ramanaidu under his banner Suresh Productions. Ramanaidu had produced the original film Devatha (1982). Cinematography was handled by Vinayagam, and editing by Chakrapani.

Soundtrack 
The songs are composed by Shankar–Ganesh. S. P. Balasubrahmanyam and P. Susheela, who sang for the original film, also sang for this film.

Release and reception 
Deivapiravi was released on 14 April 1985 coinciding with Puthandu. The film faced competition from two other Mohan-starrers Udaya Geetham, which released a day earlier, and Pillai Nila. The film was not as successful as those films, but ran for one-hundred days. Mohan gained appreciation for his performance in the film. Jayamanmadhan of Kalki wrote leaving the theater feels like it was like sitting day before yesterday probably because Hindi film ran because of Sridevi.

References 

1980s Tamil-language films
1985 films
Films produced by D. Ramanaidu
Films scored by Shankar–Ganesh
Indian romantic drama films
Suresh Productions films
Tamil remakes of Telugu films